Mathieu Eugene is a Haitian-American politician. A Democrat, he was a New York City Councilmember for the 40th district, and was the first Haitian-born city councilmember.

His district included portions of Crown Heights, East Flatbush, Flatbush, Kensington, Midwood, Prospect Park and Prospect Lefferts Gardens in Brooklyn.

Life and career
Eugene is a Haitian-American, born in Cap-Haïtien in April 1954.

He is also a physician, having attended medical school in Belgium, the Dominican Republic, and Mexico.

His medical degree is from Universidad del Noreste in Mexico but he does not practice in the U.S.

Before he became a City Council member, he was a community organizer; he still runs a youth program in Brooklyn.

New York City Council
In 2006, Councilwoman Yvette Clarke resigned following her election to the United States Congress. In the special election to replace her, Eugene won both the non-partisan primary and the general election. Eugene is the first Haitian-born elected official in the state of New York.

Eugene was re-elected in 2009, 2013, and 2017.

Personal life 
Eugene is a practicing Catholic.

He is a master and black belt in the martial art of Taekwondo.

Electoral history

References

External links
 Official NYC Council Website
@CmMathieuEugene (official twitter)

People from Cap-Haïtien
American politicians of Haitian descent
Haitian emigrants to the United States
New York City Council members
Living people
New York (state) Democrats
Candidates in the 2021 United States elections
21st-century American politicians
African-American New York City Council members
1954 births
21st-century African-American politicians
20th-century African-American people